Coleophora amasicola is a moth of the family Coleophoridae that is endemic to Turkey.

References

External links

amasicola
Endemic fauna of Turkey
Moths described in 1942
Moths of Asia